The Queen's Nose is a British television series based on the children's novel by Dick King-Smith. The series, which broadcast on BBC One (CBBC), was adapted by Steve Attridge, and ran from 15 November 1995 to 16 December 2003 for seven series and 42 episodes.

Series overview

Episodes

Series 1 (1995)

Series 2 (1996)

Series 3 (1998)

Specials (1999–2000)
Two specials which broadcast in 1999 and 2002 are feature-length versions for both series two and series three.

Series 4 (2000)

Series 5 (2001)

Series 6 (2002)

Series 7 (2003)

References

External links
Queen's Nose Episodes at BBC Programs

Queen's Nose